Alessia Maurelli (born 22 August 1996) is an Italian group rhythmic gymnast who captains it from 2016. She is the 2020 Olympic Group All-around bronze medalist, a two-time (2014, 2018) World Group All-around silver medalist and three-time European (2021, 2018, and 2014) Group All-around silver medalist.

A member of the national squad since 2014, Maurelli ascended to prominence on the international scene at the 2016 Summer Olympics, where she and fellow rhythmic gymnasts Sofia Lodi, Camilla Patriarca, Marta Pagnini, and Martina Centofanti attained a total score of 35.549 on the combination of hoops, ribbons, and clubs for the fourth spot in the final, slipping her team off the podium (and the second place) by nearly two tenths of a point.

She won a bronze medal, in Women's rhythmic group all-around, at the 2020 Summer Olympics.

Career
She started practicing rhythmic gymnastics at age 9 in Associazione Ginnastica Estense O. Putinati. In January 2014 she was recognized by Emanuela Maccarani, who invited her to be part of the National Rhythmic Gymnastics team of Italy. She then moved to Desio and made her international debut at the 2014 European Championships in Baku, Azerbaijan, where she and her team took silver medal in Group All-around competition. They also won bronze medal in Group All-around and 3 + 2 Final at the 2014 World Cup Sofia. On September 21-28, she competed at the 2014 World Championships, her first one, which took place in Izmir, Turkey. Her team took silver medal in Group All-around, less than 0.2 point away from gold, was won by Bulgaria. In finals, they placed 5th with 10 Clubs and 4th with 3 Balls + 2 Ribbons.

Detailed Olympic results

References

External links
 
 Alessia Maurelli at the Italian Olympic Committee (CONI)
 

1996 births
Living people
Italian rhythmic gymnasts
Gymnasts at the 2016 Summer Olympics
Olympic gymnasts of Italy
European Games competitors for Italy
Gymnasts at the 2015 European Games
Gymnasts at the 2019 European Games
Medalists at the Rhythmic Gymnastics European Championships
Medalists at the Rhythmic Gymnastics World Championships
Gymnasts at the 2020 Summer Olympics
Medalists at the 2020 Summer Olympics
Olympic medalists in gymnastics
Olympic bronze medalists for Italy
21st-century Italian women